Diana Nankunda Mutasingwa also referred to as Diana Mutasingwa Kagyenyi is a Uganda politician. She is the current Cabinet Minister of State in the Office of the Vice President of Uganda. Diana became the first Buikwe's minister. On May 19, 2021, Mutasingwa Diana Nankunda Kagyenyi was sworn in as the Buikwe District Woman Member of Parliament under the National Resistance Movement political party. She replaced Judith Babirye.

Background and education 
She is a resident of Bukaya in Njeru division  and born to Charles Mutasingwa. When Diana was bed ridden in Nairobi, Charles Mutasingwa explored the villages, held  rallies and door-to-door meeting on behalf of her daughter Diana Kagyenyi Mutasingwa, who was reported to have been poisoned during her campaigns in parts of Nyenga Division in 2018. She completed her primary school from Kampala Parent's School. She later joined Greenhill Academy for both  Uganda Certificate of Education (UCE) and Uganda Advanced Certificate of Education (UACE). She was awarded a diploma and a degree from Hertfordshire International College.

Life before politics 
She was employed as the Human Resource Manager at Afro Freight Clearing and Forwarding Company before joining politics.

Political career 
Before contesting as Buikwe's  Woman Member of Parliament, she first contested for Njeru Municipality mayor in 2019, but was defeated by Yasin Kyazze. Buikwe district had never had a minister until when President Museveni appointed Diana as the State Minister  in the Office of the Vice President. Nankunda is  working with  Jessica Alupo, the Vice President of Uganda who replaced  Edward Ssekandi. She was appointed as the Buikwe District Football Associations brand ambassador in Uganda and she became the official sponsor for the  District Football Associations for the next five year starting in 2021.

See also 

 List of government ministries of Uganda
 Cabinet of Uganda
 Parliament of Uganda
 Buikwe District
 Judith Babirye

References

External links 

 Website of the Parliament of Uganda.

National Resistance Movement politicians
People from Buikwe District
Living people
Members of the Parliament of Uganda
Women members of the Parliament of Uganda
Year of birth missing (living people)